Tögrög is a sum (district) of Övörkhangai Province in south-central Mongolia. In 2008, its population was 2,689.

References 

Districts of Övörkhangai Province